Domingo Felipe Maza Zavala (4 November 1922 – 7 November 2010) was a Venezuelan economist. He was director of the Central Bank of Venezuela from 1997 to 2004. He had previously been a member of COPRE (1985) and a Congressional Deputy (1969–1971). A professor at UCV and the IUNEP, he also had a financial column in El Nacional from 1949 to 1963.

References

1922 births
2010 deaths
20th-century Venezuelan economists
Members of the Venezuelan Chamber of Deputies
Academic staff of the Central University of Venezuela
Central University of Venezuela alumni